Manjula (8 November 1954 – 12 September 1986) was an Indian actress who acted in Kannada language films and also few Tamil (credited as Kumari Manjula) and Telugu films. She was one of the most successful and prominent actresses of Kannada films in 1970s and 1980s. She acted in more than 100 films and won several awards for her performances,  including a Filmfare Award.

Personal life
Manjula was born to M. H. Shivanna and Deveramma in Honnenahalli, a village in Tumkur District. family, her father Shivanna was a police sub inspector. She was married to film director Amrutham who worked with her in films such as Hudugaatada Hudugi and Kanasu Nanasu. The couple had a son, Abhishek.

Career
Manjula started her acting career in 1965 with a drama troupe Prabhat Kalavidaru. She entered the Kannada film industry in a small role in Mane Katti Nodu in 1966. Her debut as a heroine was in the 1972 film Yaara Saakshi, directed by veteran director M. R. Vittal. She shared screen with Kannada actors including Rajkumar, Vishnuvardhan, Srinath, Ashok and Shankar Nag. Her most successful pairing  was with Srinath and they acted together in about 35 films.

She starred in over one hundred films. She specialized in the role of the bossy tomboyish village belle which brought her huge success as a top Kannada heroine in the late 1970s. Some of her notable films are Sampathige Savaal, Eradu Kanasu, Sose Thanda Sowbhagya, Besuge and Seetharamu. She also acted with well known actors in other languages like Ramakrishna (Telugu), Kamalahasan and Rajinikanth (Tamil).

Filmography

Kannada, Telugu and Tamil

Tamil

Telugu

Death
Manjula died from an accidental fire in the kitchen  on 19 September 1986.

References
Citations

Sources

External links 
 

1954 births
Actresses from Karnataka
Indian film actresses
Actresses in Kannada cinema
Kannada people
People from Tumkur
Filmfare Awards South winners
20th-century Indian actresses
Child actresses in Kannada cinema
Actresses in Telugu cinema
Indian child actresses
Actresses in Tamil cinema
1986 suicides
Suicides in India